Pascal Nkayi (18 September 1911 – ?) was a Congolese politician. He served as Minister of Finance of Republic of the Congo from June until September 1960.

Biography 
Pascal Nkayi was born on 18 September 1911 in Palabala, Belgian Congo. He attended four years of normal school. In 1934 he became a teacher. He later took up work as a clerk in the postal service. In May 1954 he became assistant treasurer of the Association du Personnel Indigene de la Colonie labour union.

In 1960 the Congo became independent and Nkayi was elected in the Bas-Congo district on an Alliance des Bakongo ticket to the Chamber of Deputies with 107 preferential votes, the smallest margin of victory among any successful candidates. He served as Minister of Finance in Patrice Lumumba's government, which was officially invested by Parliament on 24 June 1960. On 27 July Nkayi held a press conference to share his concerns about the national decline in social and economic activity following independence. Alluding to Lumumba, he denounced "demagogic statements that harm the interests of the Congolese people". In August the government sent him to Geneva to negotiate with Belgian authorities over financial and monetary concerns. In early September he established a monetary council and began issuing new paper currency. On 9 September Lumumba announced that he had dismissed Nkayi from his cabinet.

Citations

References 

 
 
 
 
 

1911 births
Finance ministers of the Democratic Republic of the Congo
Lumumba Government members
People of the Congo Crisis
Year of death missing
Members of the National Assembly (Democratic Republic of the Congo)